USS Energy (AM-436/MSO-436) was an Aggressive-class minesweeper acquired by the U.S. Navy for the task of removing mines that had been placed in the water to prevent the safe passage of ships.

The second ship to be named Energy by the Navy,  AM-436 was launched 13 February 1953 by J. M. Martinac Shipbuilding Co., Tacoma, Washington; sponsored by Mrs. A M. Baughman; and commissioned 16 July 1954. She was reclassified MSO-436, 7 February 1955.

West Coast operations 

Energy arrived at Long Beach, California, her home port, 3 August 1954, and began training along the U.S. West Coast with the ships of her division. On 4 January 1956, she sailed for her first tour of duty in the western Pacific Ocean, taking part in a large-scale exercise off Iwo Jima, and training with ships of the Republic of Korea and the Republic of China. Returning to her home port 15 June, she cruised along the west coast during the next year, conducting sonar tests and serving as a schoolship for officers of the Thailand Navy.

Matsu and Quemoy crisis 

During her second deployment to the Far East, from 2 June 1958 to 6 January 1959, Energy stood by at Taiwan during the crisis brought on by renewed Communist shelling of Quemoy and Matsu, and again exercised with Chinese minesweepers.

Specialized mine warfare exercises and general training with the fleet along with visits to various west ports, were conducted through the summer of 1960. For the remainder of the year Energy served with the U.S. 7th Fleet in Far East waters.

Final status 

Energy was loaned to the Philippine Navy as Davao de Norte 5 July 1972.  Energy was later returned and stricken 1 July 1977, she was subsequently sold for scrapping on 8 July 1977.

References

External links 

 NavSource Online: Mine Warfare Vessel Photo Archive - Energy (MSO 436) - ex-AM-436

 

Aggressive-class minesweepers
Ships built in Tacoma, Washington
1953 ships
Cold War minesweepers of the United States
Aggressive-class minesweepers of the Philippine Navy